The 1985 European Formula Three Cup was the inaugural European Formula Three Cup race held at the Paul Ricard Circuit on October 27, 1985. It was won by Italian Alex Caffi in dominant fashion having achieved pole position, fastest lap and the race win, driving for Team Gulf Coloni, who finished ahead of Swede Thomas Danielsson and German Volker Weidler.

Drivers and teams

Classification

Qualifying

Race

See also
FIA European Formula Three Cup

References

FIA European Formula Three Cup
FIA European Formula Three Cup